The Murrumbidgee District was a district (also called a squatting district, pastoral district or grazing district) used in New South Wales in the nineteenth century to refer to the land between the Murrumbidgee River and Murray River, that is now mostly known as the Riverina region. Some maps show the district included the parts of what is now the Australian Capital Territory that was to the west of the Murrumbidgee River.  The district was originally one of the districts used to refer to the area outside the limits of location, but later continued to be used as the name after counties were proclaimed within this area. It went out of use after 1884, when new districts were proclaimed.

In 1843 it had a population of 1463, with 226,682 sheep, 93,458 cattle, 2315 horses,  in cultivation and 172 stations.

In 1852 the district included 12 million acres (49,000 km²) total, with 400,000 sheep, 100,000 cattle and 3,000 horses 

Early maps show the eastern boundary of the district being the Murrumbidgee River, while an 1871 map shows the eastern boundary being the Goodradigbee River, with the Monaro district in the area between the Goodradigbee and the Murrumbidgee.

It comprised the area of the counties of Wakool, Townsend, Cadell, Denison, Urana, Hume, Goulburn, Wynyard, Mitchell, Selwyn, Buccleuch and part of Caira and Waradgery.

References
Plan of measured lands in the Parish of Mulawa: Murrumbidgee District, New South Wales, 1857

History of New South Wales